Metleucauge is a genus of long-jawed orb-weavers that was first described by Herbert Walter Levi in 1980.

Species
 it contains eight species, found in Asia and the United States:
Metleucauge chikunii Tanikawa, 1992 – China, Korea, Taiwan, Japan
Metleucauge davidi (Schenkel, 1963) – China, Taiwan
Metleucauge dentipalpis (Kroneberg, 1875) – Central Asia
Metleucauge eldorado Levi, 1980 (type) – USA
Metleucauge kompirensis (Bösenberg & Strand, 1906) – Russia (Far East), China, Korea, Taiwan, Japan
Metleucauge minuta Yin, 2012 – China
Metleucauge yaginumai Tanikawa, 1992 – Japan
Metleucauge yunohamensis (Bösenberg & Strand, 1906) – Russia (Far East), China, Korea, Taiwan, Japan

In synonymy:
M. sinensis (Schenkel, 1953) = Metleucauge yunohamensis (Bösenberg & Strand, 1906)
M. vena (Dönitz & Strand, 1906) = Metleucauge kompirensis (Bösenberg & Strand, 1906)

See also
 List of Tetragnathidae species

References

Araneomorphae genera
Spiders of Asia
Spiders of Russia
Tetragnathidae